Amanda Kramer (born December 26, 1961) is an England-based American composer and touring musician. Kramer first gained prominence as a member of the techno-pop band Information Society and later performed with other alternative rock and new wave groups such as 10,000 Maniacs, World Party, and the Golden Palominos. She has been the keyboardist for the Psychedelic Furs since 2002.

Background and family
Amanda Kramer was born on December 26, 1961, in New York City. Her parents were Beverly Dennis and Russell Dennis, both of whom were actors throughout the 1950s. Beverly Dennis was cast in supporting roles in several Hollywood features, including William A. Wellman's classic 1951 proto-feminist western Westward the Women and Jean Negulesco's drama Take Care of My Little Girl (1951), and appeared regularly on the CBS (and later NBC) variety hour The Red Buttons Show (1952–1955). Russell Dennis gained minor roles in William Castle's mystery drama Hollywood Story (1951) and Mark Robson's romantic war picture Bright Victory (1951). In the 1950s both Beverly and Russell were blacklisted from mainstream Hollywood productions due to suspected Communist or Soviet affiliations. In response they soon sought out alternative careers in psychiatry and medicine, respectively.

Beverly Dennis would become a therapist while retaining a keen interest in social advocacy, particularly for Second-wave feminism, in which she worked in furthering female empowerment in theatre, literature, film, and journalism. Russell Dennis died suddenly on March 29, 1964, aged 48, not long after receiving his medical degree. Beverly later remarried to World War II veteran and advertising executive Jerry Kramer. The family lived on New York's Upper West Side, during which time young Amanda Kramer attended Manhattan's progressive Little Red School House (LREI). The family later relocated to Beverly Hills, California.

Early life
While growing up in New York City of the 1960s and 1970s, Kramer expressed interest in music from a young age and soon began to train in classical piano. Kramer took inspiration from the emerging art and cultural movements of the times. Inspired by the raw energy and spirit of punk rock and the dexterity and freedom of jazz, Kramer's interests would be piqued by the emerging musical technologies of the 1980s. 

As a teenager, Kramer began her academic study of music at the Manhattan School of Music Preparatory Division, studying piano with Sonia Vargas. She would continue her studies at University of California at Santa Cruz and the San Francisco Conservatory of Music. While studying electronic music and video production at the School of the Museum of Fine Arts in Boston, Massachusetts, Kramer encountered fellow student James Cassidy, which resulted in Cassidy inviting her to join his Minneapolis-based dance-pop group, Information Society.

Music career
In 1988, Information Society released their self-titled major label debut on Tommy Boy/Warner Bros. Records, which was certified Gold. After departing from the band, Kramer returned to New York City to further a career that would include classical, pop, rock, and scoring for film and television. Kramer began a string of collaborations, first with Anton Fier as a core member of the Golden Palominos, recording several albums, including A Dead Horse (1989) and Drunk with Passion (1991). As part of the Golden Palominos, Kramer would write and record with Michael Stipe, Bob Mould, Bill Laswell, and Richard Thompson, amongst others.

Kramer then became a member of 10,000 Maniacs, recording and touring the platinum-selling releases Our Time in Eden (1992) and MTV Unplugged (1993), before joining the British group World Party. Her first live performance as a member of the latter would be a Pyramid Stage appearance at the 1994 Glastonbury Festival.

In the succeeding years, Kramer would be engaged in much studio and road work, playing on albums by artists such as Lloyd Cole (The Negatives, 2000), the Church (Man Woman Life Death Infinity, 2018), and, most recently, the Psychedelic Furs' first studio record in three decades, Made of Rain (2020). Kramer has been a member of the band since 2002, completing many international headlining tours.

Kramer has provided further keyboard duties for television performances, tours, and festival appearances with a variety of artists, including Eurythmics, Julee Cruise, David Hykes and the Harmonic Choir, Steve Kilbey, and Tom Bailey. From 2007 to 2008, she toured with Siouxsie Sioux and performed on the Finale: The Last Mantaray & More Show live DVD.

Solo career
Kramer has released four solo albums, incorporating the genres of world music, classical, experimental, jazz, and ambient: Wintermass (with Blake Leyh, 1994), Samsara (1998), Fallen Light Renew (2004) and Under the Sea (2011). The latter two albums were inspired by the poetry of William Blake and T.S. Eliot, respectively, and feature contributions from Karl Wallinger and Julee Cruise, amongst others.

Film and television composition
Kramer has also composed for film and television. Her work can be heard on the Discovery Channel series Globe Trekker (later Pilot Guides), and has been featured on various television programs, including the PBS documentary Cayutaville (1998) and ABC's 20/20 (1997), as well as in the feature film True Crime (1996).

Education
 2010: UCLA, California; course in harmonic principals in tonal and atonal music. 
 2001–2002: University of Bristol, Bristol; master's diploma in composition for film, television and theater.
 1998–2000: The New School, New York City, New York; Bachelor of Arts degree, emphasis in music.
 1998–1999: Morley College, London; orchestral conducting with Lawrence Leonard.
 1996–1997: Mannes School of Music, extension, New York; mediaeval notation, orchestration. 
 1995: One year Indian classical music study with David Hykes, New York.
 1989–1991: Juilliard School, extension, New York; music theory and analysis with Samuel Zyman.
 1985–1986: School of the Museum of Fine Arts, Boston, Massachusetts; electronic music and video production.
 1983: San Francisco Conservatory of Music, California; harpsichord with Laurette Goldberg.
 1980–1983: University of California at Santa Cruz, California; music major, piano with Lena-Liis Kiesel, voice with Paul Hilliard, harpsichord with Linda Burman-Hall. 
 1975–1977: Manhattan School of Music Preparatory Division, New York; piano with Sonia Vargas.

References

External links
 Beverly Dennis, 79, Actress Who Became Psychotherapist, Is Dead
 Amanda Kramer
 Amanda Kramer

Living people
American expatriates in England
Songwriters from New York (state)
American television composers
Women television composers
Singers from New York City
American new wave musicians
American synth-pop musicians
21st-century American composers
The Psychedelic Furs members
The Golden Palominos members
20th-century American women singers
20th-century American composers
Information Society (band) members
21st-century American keyboardists
21st-century American women musicians
Women keyboardists
20th-century women composers
1961 births
21st-century women composers
20th-century American singers